Anton Giulio Barrili (14 December 1836 – 14 August 1908), Italian novelist, was born at Savona, and was educated for the legal profession, which he abandoned for journalism in Genoa. He was a volunteer in the campaign of 1859 and served with Garibaldi in 1866 and 1867. From 1865 onwards he published a large number of books of fiction, which had wide popularity, his work being commonly compared with that of Victor Cherbuliez.

Some of the best of the later ones are Santa Cecilia (1866), Come un Sogno (1875), and L’Olmo e l'Edera (1877). His Raggio di Dio appeared in 1899. Barrili also wrote two plays and various volumes of criticism, including Li rinnovamento letterario italiano (1890). He was elected to the Italian chamber of deputies in 1876; and in 1889 became professor of Italian literature at Genoa.

He died in 1908.

References

External links
 
 
 

1836 births
1908 deaths
Italian politicians
Academic staff of the University of Genoa
19th-century Italian novelists
19th-century male writers